The Botanical Society of America (BSA) represents professional and amateur botanists, researchers, educators and students in over 80 countries of the world. It functions as a United States nonprofit 501(c)(3)  membership society.

History
The society was first established in 1893 as an outgrowth from the Botanical Club of the American Association for the Advancement of Science at a meeting in Rochester, New York, on August 22, 1892. The organizing principles of the society were the enhancement of the study of plants in North America and to professionalize such efforts. In 1906, the organization merged with the Society for Plant Morphology and Physiology and the American Mycological Society.

Sections
The society has 16 special interest sections:

 Bryological and lichenological
 Developmental and Structural
 Ecological
 Economic
 Genetics
 Historical
 Microbiological
 Mycological
 Paleobotanical
 Phycological
 Physiological
 Phytochemical
 Pteridological
 Systematic
 Teaching
 Tropical biology

Former presidents 

Former presidents of the society have included:
 William Trelease - Director of the Missouri Botanical Garden and the first president of the society
 Nathaniel Lord Britton - Cofounder of the New York Botanical Garden
 Margaret Clay Ferguson - Head of the Department of Botany at Wellesley College and the first female president of the society
 William Francis Ganong - Professor of Botany, Smith College and historian and cartographer of New Brunswick
 Albert S. Hitchcock - Chief Botanist for the USDA
 William Chambers Coker - Founder of the Coker Arboretum at the University of North Carolina
 Katherine Esau - National Medal of Science recipient and namesake of the Katherine Esau Award in structural and developmental biology
 Vernon Cheadle - Chancellor of the University of California, Santa Barbara
 G. Ledyard Stebbins − evolutionary biologist at the University of California, Davis
 Peter H. Raven - Director of the Missouri Botanical Garden
Loren Rieseberg - Professor of Botany at the University of British Columbia

Publications 
The society publishes the following scientific journals:
 American Journal of Botany, since 1914
 Plant Science Bulletin, since 1955
Applications in Plant Sciences, since 2009

References

External links
 
 Archive of Plant Science Bulletin
 Publications by the Botanical Society of America at the Biodiversity Heritage Library

 
Professional associations based in the United States
Missouri Botanical Garden
Natural Science Collections Alliance members
Non-profit organizations based in St. Louis
501(c)(3) organizations
Organizations established in 1893
1893 establishments in New York (state)
Botany in North America